The second Mustafa Mero government was the first Syrian government during the presidency of Bashar al-Assad. It was established on 13 December 2001 and lasted until 10 September 2003 when the President designated Muhammad Naji al-Otari to form a new government.

Composition
The new government was headed by Mustafa Mero, who repeated term, and formed by 33 ministers. There were 15 ministers retaining their office and 18 new ministers. There were two women: Najwa Qassab Hassan as Minister of Culture and Ghada al Jabi as Minister of Social Affairs and Labor. Five members were part of the Baathist leadership: Mero and his four deputy ministers.

See also
Cabinet of Syria
Government ministries of Syria
List of prime ministers of Syria

References

2000s in Syria
Bashar al-Assad
Syria
 
Lists of political office-holders in Syria
2001 establishments in Syria
2003 disestablishments in Syria
Cabinets established in 2001
Cabinets disestablished in 2003